Cuban Spanish is the variety of the Spanish language as it is spoken in Cuba.  As a Caribbean variety of Spanish, Cuban Spanish shares a number of features with nearby varieties, including coda weakening and neutralization, non-inversion of Wh-questions, and a lower rate of dropping of subject pronouns compared to other Spanish varieties. As a variety spoken in Latin America, it has seseo and lacks the  pronoun.

Origins 
Cuban Spanish is most similar to, and originates largely from, the Spanish that is spoken in the Canary Islands and Andalusia. Cuba owes much of its speech patterns to the heavy Canarian migrations of the 19th and early 20th centuries. The accent of La Palma is the closest of the Canary Island accents to the Cuban accent. Many Cubans and returning Canarians settled in the Canary Islands after the revolution of 1959. Migration of other Spanish settlers (Asturians, Catalans, Castilians), and especially Galicians also occurred, but left less influence on the accent.

Much of the typical Cuban vocabulary stems from Canarian lexicon. For example, guagua ('bus') differs from standard Spanish autobús. An example of Canarian usage for a Spanish word is the verb fajarse ('to fight').<ref>fajar at Diccionario de la Real Academia Española.</ref> In Spain, the verb would be pelearse, and fajar exists as a non-reflexive verb related to the hemming of a skirt.

Much of the vocabulary that is peculiar to Cuban Spanish comes from the different historic influences on the island. Many words come from the Canary Islands, but some words are of West African, French, or indigenous Taino origin, as well as peninsular Spanish influence from outside the Canary Islands, such as Andalusian or Galician.

The West African influence is due to the large Afro-Cuban population, most of whom are descended from African slaves imported in the 19th century.
Some Cuban words of African origin include  'wonderful',  'friend', and  'Yoruba deity'. In addition, different Afro-Cuban religions and secret societies also different African languages in their practices and liturgies.

Many Afro-Cubans in the 19th century also spoke Bozal Spanish, derived from the term , which originally referred to muzzles for wild dogs and horses, and came to be used to refer to enslaved Africans who spoke little Spanish. Some elements of Bozal Spanish can still be found in the speech of elderly Afro-Cubans in remote rural areas, in Palo Mayombe chants, and in trance states during possession rituals in Santería.
 
Due to historical commercial ties between the US and Cuba, American English has lent several words, including some for clothing, such as pulóver [sic] (which is used to mean "T-shirt") and chor ("shorts", with the typical Spanish change from English sh to ch, like mentioned above,  may be pronounced [], the pronunciation of English "sh"). Anglicisms related to baseball, such as strike and foul are frequently employed, with Spanish pronunciation.

Phonology
Characteristic of Cuban Spanish is the weak pronunciation of consonants, especially at the end of a syllable. Final  more frequently becomes  in the eastern and central regions of Cuba. Postvocalic  tends to disappear entirely. All of these characteristics occur to one degree or another in other Caribbean varieties, as well as in many dialects in Andalusia (in southern Spain)—the place of historical origin of these characteristics.

This trait is shared with most American varieties of Spanish spoken in coastal and low areas (Lowland Spanish), as well as with Canarian Spanish and the Spanish spoken in the southern half of the Iberian Peninsula.

Take for example, the following sentence:

 (Eso' perro' no tienen dueño')

('Those dogs do not have owners')

Other examples: disfrutar ("to enjoy") is pronounced , and fresco ("fresh") becomes . In Havana, después ("after[ward]") is typically pronounced  (de'pué'/despué').

Another instance of consonant weakening ("lenition") in Cuban Spanish (as in many other dialects) is the deletion of intervocalic  in the participle ending -ado (-ao/-a'o), as in cansado (cansao/cansa'o)  "tired").

In some areas of Cuba, the voiceless affricate [] (spelled as ch) is deaffricated to [].

The Spanish of the eastern provinces (the five provinces comprising what was formerly Oriente Province) is closer to that of the Dominican Republic than to the Spanish spoken in the western part of the island.

At the same time, the non-assimilated and unmerged pronunciations are more common.

Morphology and syntax
For example, plato ("plate") > platico (instead of platito), and momentico instead of momentito; but cara ("face") becomes carita. This form is common to the Venezuelan, Cuban, Costa Rican, Dominican, and Colombian dialects.

The suffix -ero is often used with a place name to refer to a person from that place; thus habanero, guantanamera, etc. A person from Santiago de Cuba is santiaguero (compare santiagués "from Santiago de Compostela (Galicia, Spain)", santiaguino "from Santiago de Chile").

Wh-questions, when the subject is a pronoun, are usually not inverted. Where speakers of most other varieties of Spanish would ask "¿Qué quieres?" or "¿Qué quieres tú?", Cuban speakers would more often ask "¿Qué tú quieres?" (This form is also characteristic of Dominican, Isleño, and Puerto Rican Spanish.)

Cuban Spanish also frequently uses expressions with personal infinitives, a combined preposition, noun or pronoun, and verbal infinitive where speakers in other dialects would typically use a conjugated subjunctive form. For example, instead of  'that happened before I arrived here'. This type of construction is found elsewhere in the Caribbean and occurs in all speech styles.

Cuban Spanish uses the familiar second-person pronoun  in many contexts where other varieties of Spanish would use the formal .
Voseo is practically non-existent in Cuba. It was historically present in the countryside of eastern Cuba.

In keeping with the socialist polity of the country, the term  ("comrade" or "friend") is often used instead of the traditional señor/señora.

Manners

To speak to the elderly or to strangers, Cubans sometimes speak more formally as a sign of respect. They shake hands both on greeting and on leaving someone. Men often exchange friendly hugs (abrazos), and both men and women often greet friends and family with a hug and a kiss on the cheek.

However Cubans tend to speak affectionately, such as by addressing a stranger with mi corazón ("my heart"), mi vida ("my life"), or cariño ("dear", "darling") are common. Mi amor ("my love") is used, even between strangers, when at least one of them is a woman (for example, in being served in a shop). Cubans are less likely to use the formal second-person singular pronoun usted to speak to a stranger, elder or superior. Tú is considered acceptable in all but very formal situations; regular use of the usted'' form for people one is familiar with can be seen by some Cubans as an affectation or a mark of coldness.

See also

Spanish dialects and varieties

References

Bibliography

External links 
 Learn Cuban Spanish
 Cuban Spanish 101
 Cuban Spanish Guide
 Learn Spanish and Cuban Slang

Caribbean Spanish
Cuban culture
Spanish
Languages of Cuba
Spanish-Cuban culture